Həsənqaya or Gasankaya may refer to:
Həsənqaya, Barda, Azerbaijan
Həsənqaya, Tartar, Azerbaijan

See also
Həsənqala (disambiguation)